Fanny Perret (born ) is a Swiss group rhythmic gymnast. She represents Switzerland in international competitions. She competed at World championships, including at the 2005 World Rhythmic Gymnastics Championships.

References

Further reading 
 2005 Swiss Group
 2005 World championships

1988 births
Living people
Swiss rhythmic gymnasts
Place of birth missing (living people)